The 2013 heat wave in the United Kingdom and Ireland was a period of unusually hot weather primarily in July 2013, with isolated warm days in June and August. A prolonged high pressure system over Britain and Ireland caused higher than average temperatures for 19 consecutive days in July, reaching  at Heathrow and Northolt. 

Temperatures reached  in Ireland. At 19 days, the July heatwave was the longest continuous period of hot weather in the UK since August 1997.

Timeline

Heat waves in the United Kingdom are declared when the threshold maximum day temperature and a minimum night temperature are exceeded for at least two consecutive days. On 12 July, the Met Office released heat wave alerts across much of England, with Yorkshire and the Humber placed in the level three category out of four alert levels.

The heatwave ended on 23 July with heavy thunderstorms, bringing flooding and lightning strikes that caused delays on motorways and railways, power cuts and fires. Despite this, temperatures still remained above average for the time of year. On 29 July, another spell of thunderstorms hit the UK. Manchester for example was hit by three thunderstorms in eight hours. Three days later on 1 August, the temperatures rose again, recording the warmest August temperature since 2003. 

In some places, 1 August was warmer than all of the days in July. By 2 August temperatures began to return to normal.

Impact 
On 18 July, the London School of Hygiene and Tropical Medicine reported that the first 9 days of the heat wave had caused up to an additional 760 deaths in the UK.

Emergency services 
The heat wave led to rises in both the number of calls to the emergency services and admissions to A&E departments. The large numbers of people using rivers, lakes and the sea to cool off led to a large increase in the number of calls to lifeguards. The London Fire Brigade reported having to deal with double the number of grass fires in the capital compared to the previous year. Wildfires were also reported in Epping Forest in Essex, the Dorset coast, the valleys of southern Wales and Tentsmuir Forest in Scotland.

Ecology 
Following declines in the summer of 2012 due to wet and windy conditions, butterfly numbers saw a surge due to the prolonged warm weather. The warmer waters around the British coasts led to an increase in the number of jellyfish sightings, particularly the moon jellyfish. 

The death of thousands of fish in rivers and lakes was attributed to the elevated temperatures lowering the amount of oxygen in the water to toxic levels.

References 

 

2013 heat waves
2013 disasters in the United Kingdom
2013 in Ireland
2013 meteorology
Heat waves in the United Kingdom
Weather events in Ireland
July 2013 events in Europe